Henry Rawlinson may refer to:
Henry Rawlinson (MP) (1743–1786), Member of Parliament for Liverpool in the late 18th century
Sir Henry Rawlinson, 1st Baronet (1810–1895), British diplomat and Orientalist
Henry Rawlinson, 1st Baron Rawlinson (1864–1925), his son, British general in the First World War
Sir Henry Rawlinson, a fictional character created by Vivian Stanshall, used most notably on the LP Sir Henry at Rawlinson End